Acanthoderes latevittata is a species of beetle in the family Cerambycidae. It was described by Per Olof Christopher Aurivillius in 1921.

References

Acanthoderes
Beetles described in 1921